Lucas Soares de Almeida (born 10 December 1997), is a Brazilian professional footballer who plays as a rightback for Portuguese club Casa Pia.

Professional career
A youth product of the Brazilian club Cruzeiro, Soares moved to the Portuguese club Alverca for the 2018-19 season. On 6 July 2019, he signed a professional contract with Vitória. Soares made his professional debut with Vitória in a 1-0 Taça da Liga win over C.D. Feirense on 5 August 2019. He spent the 2021-22 season on loan with Casa Pia. On 8 June 2022, he transferred pfermantly to Casa Pia as they achieved promotion to the Primeira Liga.

References

External links
 
 ZeroZero Profile

1998 births
Living people
Sportspeople from Goiânia
Brazilian footballers
Association football fullbacks
Vitória S.C. players
Vitória S.C. B players
F.C. Alverca players
Casa Pia A.C. players
Primeira Liga players
Liga Portugal 2 players
Campeonato de Portugal (league) players
Brazilian expatriate footballers
Brazilian expatriate sportspeople in Portugal
Expatriate footballers in Portugal